Lamnamoon Sor.Sumalee is a Thai former Muay Thai fighter. He was a 4 times Lumpinee Stadium champion during the golden era of Muay Thai.

Biography & career
Lamnamoon started Muay Thai at the age of 14 at the Sit Pongtap camp, he had his first fight the same year for which he was paid 100 baht. He moved to Bangkok two years later to join the Sor.Sumalee gym.
Lamnamoon spent his entire career at the Sor.Sumalee gym alongside other champions such as Panomrunglek Por Chaiwat, Superlek Sorn E-Sarn and Jompoplek Sor Sumalee.
Known for his vicious knees and lang frame Lamnamoon was a very popular fighter who captured four Lumpinee Stadium titles at 3 different weights during the 1990s. His highest purse was of 200,000 baht. 
He had memorable wins over notable fighters such as Langsuan Panyuthaphum, Chatchai Paiseetong, Jaroensap Kiatbanchong, Samkor Kiatmontep, Mathee Jadeepitak and Attachai Fairtex.

After his retirement Lamnamoon became a muay thai trainer, teaching at Sor.Sumalee and Evolve MMA in Singapore. After coming back to Thailand he opened his own gym in 2015 called Lamnamoon Muay Thai in the Ubon Ratchathani Province.
His best student is Robert Sor Thanabowon who won the channel 7 stadium 105 lbs belt in 2019.

Titles & honours
Lumpinee Stadium
 1993 Lumpinee Stadium 115 lbs Champion
 1996 Lumpinee Stadium 126 lbs Champion
 1997 Lumpinee Stadium 130 lbs Champion
 1999 Lumpinee Stadium 130 lbs Champion
Rajadamnern Stadium
 1997 Rajadamnern Stadium Fight of the Year (vs Rambojiew Por Thubtim)
World Professional Kickboxing League
 2004 WPKL World 135 lbs Champion

Fight record

|- style="background:#cfc;"
| 2004-03-27 || Win ||align=left| Mustapha Ziani ||  || Rotterdam, Netherlands || Decision || 5||3:00 
|-
! style=background:white colspan=9 |
|-  style="background:#fbb;"
| 2004- || Loss||align=left| Attachai Fairtex || Lumpinee Stadium || Bangkok, Thailand || KO || 1 || 1:36
|- style="background:#fbb;"
| 2003-10-23 || Loss ||align=left| Jaroenrit Sitjakraphan || Rajadamnern Stadium || Bangkok, Thailand || Decision || 5||3:00
|- style="background:#cfc;"
|  || Win ||align=left| Wanpichit Sitjamlong ||  || Bangkok, Thailand || Decision || 5||3:00
|- style="background:#fbb;"
| 2001-09-06 || Loss ||align=left| Khunpinit Kiattawan || Lumpinee Stadium || Bangkok, Thailand || Decision || 5||3:00
|- style="background:#cfc;"
| 2001-06-07 || Win ||align=left| Khunpinit Kiattawan || Rajadamnern Stadium || Bangkok, Thailand || Decision || 5||3:00
|- style="background:#cfc;"
| 2001-03-07 || Win ||align=left| Khunpinit Kiattawan || Lumpinee Stadium || Bangkok, Thailand || Decision || 5||3:00
|- style="background:#fbb;"
| 2001-01-07 || Loss ||align=left| Saengmorakot Waenatsapid ||  || Thailand || Decision || 5||3:00
|-  style="background:#fbb;"
| 2000-06-02 || Loss||align=left| Attachai Fairtex || Lumpinee Stadium || Bangkok, Thailand || KO (Left Elbow)|| 3 ||
|- style="background:#fbb;"
| 2000-04-08 || Loss ||align=left| Huasai Mor Payakaroon || Lumpinee Stadium || Bangkok, Thailand || Decision || 5||3:00
|- style="background:#fbb;"
| 2000-02-29 || Loss ||align=left| Samkor Kiatmontep || Lumpinee Stadium || Bangkok, Thailand || Decision || 5||3:00
|- style="background:#fbb;"
| 1999-12-07 || Loss ||align=left| Namsaknoi Yudthagarngamtorn || Lumpinee Stadium || Bangkok, Thailand || KO (Right Cross) || 3 ||
|-
! style=background:white colspan=9 |
|-  style="background:#cfc;"
| 1999-10-31 || Win ||align=left| Attachai Fairtex ||  || Ubon Ratchathani, Thailand || Decision || 5 || 3:00
|- style="background:#cfc;"
| 1999-09-25 || Win ||align=left| Rambojiew Por Thubtim || Lumpinee Stadium || Bangkok, Thailand || Decision || 5||3:00 
|-
! style=background:white colspan=9 |
|- style="background:#cfc;"
| 1999-08-10 || Win ||align=left| Chokdee Por.Pramuk || Lumpinee Stadium || Bangkok, Thailand || Decision || 5||3:00
|- style="background:#fbb;"
| 1999-03-26 || Loss ||align=left| Khunsuk Sitporamet || Rajadamnern Stadium || Bangkok, Thailand || Decision || 5||3:00
|- style="background:#fbb;"
| 1999-02-10 || Loss ||align=left| Khunsuk Sitporamet || Lumpinee Stadium || Bangkok, Thailand || Decision || 5||3:00
|- style="background:#fbb;"
| 1998-10-30 || Loss ||align=left| Kaolan Kaovichit ||  Lumpinee Stadium || Bangkok, Thailand || Decision || 5 || 3:00
|- style="background:#cfc;"
| 1998-09-29 || Win ||align=left| Rambojiew Por Thubtim || Lumpinee Stadium || Bangkok, Thailand || Decision || 5||3:00 
|-
! style=background:white colspan=9 |
|- style="background:#fbb;"
| 1998-05-26 || Loss ||align=left| Attachai Fairtex ||  Rajadamnern Stadium || Bangkok, Thailand || Decision || 5 || 3:00
|- style="background:#cfc;"
| 1998-02-27 || Win||align=left| Kaoponglek Luksuratam || Lumpinee Stadium || Bangkok, Thailand || TKO  ||  ||
|- style="background:#cfc;"
| 1997-12-19 || Win ||align=left| Samkor Kiatmontep || Lumpinee Stadium || Bangkok, Thailand || Decision || 5||3:00 
|-
! style=background:white colspan=9 |
|- style="background:#cfc;"
| 1997-11- || Win ||align=left| Sakmongkol Mongsaichol || Lumpinee Stadium || Bangkok, Thailand || Decision || 5||3:00
|- style="background:#fbb;"
| 1997-09-29 || Loss||align=left| Rambojiew Por Thubtim || Rajadamnern Stadium || Bangkok, Thailand || Decision || 5||3:00
|- style="background:#fbb;"
| 1997-04- || Loss ||align=left| Namkabuan Nongkeepahuyuth || Lumpinee Stadium || Bangkok, Thailand  || Decision || 5 || 3:00
|- style="background:#cfc;"
| 1997-02-15 || Win ||align=left| Samkor Kiatmontep || Lumpinee Stadium || Bangkok, Thailand || Decision || 5||3:00
|- style="background:#cfc;"
| 1997-01- || Win ||align=left| Hansuk Prasathinpanomrung || Lumpinee Stadium || Bangkok, Thailand || Decision || 5 || 3:00
|- style="background:#cfc;"
| 1996-12-27 || Win ||align=left| Keng Singnakhongui || Lumpinee Stadium || Bangkok, Thailand || KO  || 4 ||
|- style="background:#cfc;"
| 1996-11-26 || Win ||align=left| Rittichai Lukjaopodam || Lumpinee Stadium || Bangkok, Thailand || Decision || 5||3:00
|- style="background:#cfc;"
| 1996-08-23 || Win ||align=left| Chatchai Paiseetong || Lumpinee Stadium || Bangkok, Thailand || Decision || 5||3:00 
|-
! style=background:white colspan=9 |
|- style="background:#cfc;"
| 1996-05-21 || Win ||align=left| Mathee Jadeepitak || Lumpinee Stadium || Bangkok, Thailand || Decision || 5||3:00 
|-
! style=background:white colspan=9 |
|- style="background:#cfc;"
| 1996-04-19 || Win ||align=left| Chatchai Paiseetong || Lumpinee Stadium || Bangkok, Thailand || Decision || 5||3:00
|- style="background:#fbb;"
| 1996-03-18 || Loss ||align=left| Kaoponglek Luksuratam || Lumpinee Stadium || Bangkok, Thailand || TKO (Elbow)  || 4 ||
|- style="background:#fbb;"
| 1996-02-15 ||Loss ||align=left| Chatchai Paiseetong || Lumpinee Stadium || Bangkok, Thailand || KO (Right Hook)|| 3||
|- style="background:#cfc;"
| 1996-01-26 || Win ||align=left| Prapseuk Sitnarong || Lumpinee Stadium || Bangkok, Thailand || Decision || 5 ||3:00
|- style="background:#fbb;"
| 1995-12-08 || Loss ||align=left| Namkabuan Nongkeepahuyuth || Lumpinee Stadium || Bangkok, Thailand  || Decision || 5 || 3:00
|- style="background:#fbb;"
| 1995-10-31 || Loss ||align=left| Namkabuan Nongkeepahuyuth || Lumpinee Stadium || Bangkok, Thailand  || Decision || 5 || 3:00
|- style="background:#cfc;"
| 1995-08-22 || Win ||align=left| Mathee Jadeepitak || Lumpinee Stadium || Bangkok, Thailand || KO (Punches)||3 ||
|- style="background:#cfc;"
| 1995-06-10 || Win ||align=left| Kruekchai Kaewsamrit || Lumpinee Stadium || Bangkok, Thailand || Decision || 5||3:00
|- style="background:#cfc;"
| 1995-05-05 || Win ||align=left| Chatchai Paiseetong || Lumpinee Stadium || Bangkok, Thailand || Decision || 5||3:00
|- style="background:#cfc;"
| 1995-04-04 || Win ||align=left| Samkor Kiatmontep || Lumpinee Stadium || Bangkok, Thailand || Decision || 5||3:00
|- style="background:#cfc;"
| 1995-02-27 || Win ||align=left| Mathee Jadeepitak || Rajadamnern Stadium || Bangkok, Thailand || Decision || 5||3:00
|- style="background:#fbb;"
| 1994-12-04 || Loss ||align=left| Wangchannoi Sor Palangchai || Lumpinee Stadium ||  Bangkok, Thailand  || KO (Left Hook)||  ||
|- style="background:#fbb;"
| 1994-11-29 || Loss ||align=left| Saengmorakot Sor Ploenchit || Lumpinee Stadium || Bangkok, Thailand || KO (Punches)|| 2 ||
|- style="background:#cfc;"
| 1994-10-17 || Win ||align=left| Cheangnern Sitputthapim || Lumpinee Stadium || Bangkok, Thailand || Decision || 5 || 3:00

|- style="background:#cfc;"
| 1994-09-24 || Win ||align=left| Jaroenwit Kiatbanchong || Lumpinee Stadium || Bangkok, Thailand || KO || 3 ||

|-  style="background:#fbb;"
| 1994-08-08|| Loss||align=left| Boonlai Sor.Thanikul || Rajadamnern Stadium || Bangkok, Thailand || KO (Punches)|| 3 ||
|- style="background:#cfc;"
| 1994-07-19 || Win ||align=left| Samkor Kiatmontep || Lumpinee Stadium || Bangkok, Thailand || Decision || 5 || 3:00
|- style="background:#cfc;"
| 1994-06-10 || Win ||align=left| Namtaothong Sor.Sirikul || Lumpinee Stadium || Bangkok, Thailand || Decision || 5 || 3:00
|- style="background:#fbb;"
| 1994-05-03 || Loss||align=left| Yokthai Sithoar || Lumpinee Stadium ||  Bangkok, Thailand  || KO (Punches)|| 2||
|-  style="background:#fbb;"
| 1994-03-25|| Loss||align=left| Boonlai Sor.Thanikul || Lumpinee Stadium || Bangkok, Thailand || KO (Uppercut + Left hook)|| 2 ||

|- style="background:#fbb;"
| 1994-02-15 || Loss||align=left| Chatchai Paiseetong || Lumpinee Stadium || Bangkok, Thailand || KO || 3|| 
|- style="background:#cfc;"
| 1994-01-28 || Win ||align=left| Hansuk Prasathinpanomrung || Lumpinee Stadium || Bangkok, Thailand || Decision || 5 || 3:00
|- style="background:#fbb;"
| 1993-12-07 || Loss||align=left| Kaensak Sor.Ploenjit || Lumpinee Stadium ||  Bangkok, Thailand  || Decision || 5 || 3:00
|- style="background:#c5d2ea"
| 1993-10-16 || Draw||align=left| Kaensak Sor.Ploenjit || Rajadamnern Stadium || Bangkok, Thailand  || Decision || 5 || 3:00
|- style="background:#fbb;"
| 1993-08-31 || Loss||align=left| Karuhat Sor.Supawan || Lumpinee Stadium ||  Bangkok, Thailand  || Decision || 5 || 3:00
|- style="background:#cfc;"
| 1993-07-13 || Win ||align=left| Rittidet Sor.Ploenchit || Lumpinee Stadium ||  Bangkok, Thailand  || Decision || 5 || 3:00
|-
! style=background:white colspan=9 |
|- style="background:#fbb;"
| 1993-06-08 || Loss||align=left| Kaensak Sor.Ploenjit || Lumpinee Stadium ||  Bangkok, Thailand  || Decision || 5 || 3:00
|- style="background:#cfc;"
| 1993-04-30 || Win ||align=left| Jaroensap Kiatbanchong || Lumpinee Stadium ||  Bangkok, Thailand  || Decision || 5 || 3:00
|-
! style=background:white colspan=9 |
|- style="background:#cfc;"
| 1993-01-19 || Win||align=left| Karuhat Sor.Supawan || Lumpinee Stadium ||  Bangkok, Thailand  || Decision || 5 || 3:00
|- style="background:#fbb;"
| 1992-12-04 || Loss ||align=left| Wangchannoi Sor Palangchai || Lumpinee Stadium ||  Bangkok, Thailand  || KO || 2 ||
|- style="background:#c5d2ea;"
| 1992-11-06 || Draw||align=left| Jaroensap Kiatbanchong || Lumpinee Stadium ||  Bangkok, Thailand  || Decision || 5 || 3:00

|-  style="background:#fbb;"
| 1992-08-07 ||Loss||align=left| Pompet Naratreekul || Lumpinee Stadium || Bangkok, Thailand || Decision || 5 || 3:00
|-  style="background:#fbb;"
| 1992-07-07 ||Loss||align=left| Langsuan Panyuthaphum || Lumpinee Stadium || Bangkok, Thailand || Decision || 5 || 3:00
|-
! style=background:white colspan=9 |
|-  style="background:#cfc;"
| 1992-06-09 ||Win||align=left| Langsuan Panyuthaphum || Lumpinee Stadium || Bangkok, Thailand || Decision || 5 || 3:00
|-  style="background:#cfc;"
| 1992-04-24 ||Win||align=left| Panphet Muangsurin || Lumpinee Stadium || Bangkok, Thailand || Decision || 5 || 3:00
|-  style="background:#cfc;"
| 1992-04-07 ||Win||align=left| Chatchai Paiseetong || Lumpinee Stadium || Bangkok, Thailand || Decision || 5 || 3:00
|-  style="background:#fbb;"
| 1992-03-10 ||Loss||align=left| Tukatathong Por.Pongsawang || Lumpinee Stadium || Bangkok, Thailand || Decision || 5 || 3:00
|-  style="background:#cfc;"
| 1992-02-22 ||Win||align=left| Pairojnoi Sor.Siamchai || Lumpinee Stadium || Bangkok, Thailand || Decision || 5 || 3:00
|-  style="background:#fbb;"
| 1992-01-20 ||Loss||align=left| Thongchai Tor.Silachai || Lumpinee Stadium || Bangkok, Thailand || Decision || 5 || 3:00

|-  style="background:#fbb;"
| 1991-11-26 || Loss||align=left| Pairojnoi Sor Siamchai || Lumpinee Stadium || Bangkok, Thailand || Decision || 5 || 3:00
|- style="background:#cfc;"
| 1991-10-25 || Win||align=left| Toto Por Pongsawang || Lumpinee Stadium ||  Bangkok, Thailand  || Decision || 5 || 3:00
|- style="background:#cfc;"
| 1991-09-17 || Win||align=left| Sornsuknoi Kiatwichian || Lumpinee Stadium ||  Bangkok, Thailand  || Decision || 5 || 3:00
|- style="background:#cfc;"
| 1991- || Win||align=left| Ruengrit Sor Rachen || Lumpinee Stadium ||  Bangkok, Thailand  || Decision || 5 || 3:00
|- style="background:#cfc;"
| 1991- || Win||align=left| Dejpanom Por Pao In || Lumpinee Stadium ||  Bangkok, Thailand  || Decision || 5 || 3:00
|-  style="background:#fbb;"
| 1991-01-20 || Loss ||align=left| Thongchai Tor.Silachai || Rajadamnern Stadium || Bangkok, Thailand || Decision || 5 || 3:00
|- style="background:#cfc;"
| 1990- || Win||align=left| Pompet Kiatchtpayak || Lumpinee Stadium ||  Bangkok, Thailand  || Decision || 5 || 3:00

|- style="background:#fbb;"
| 1990-06-30 || Loss||align=left| Petchsamut Sor. Rungnakhon || Lumpinee Stadium ||  Bangkok, Thailand  || Decision || 5 || 3:00

|- style="background:#cfc;"
| 1990-04-14 || Win||align=left| Harnchai Kiatrattaphon || Lumpinee Stadium ||  Bangkok, Thailand  || Decision || 5 || 3:00
|- style="background:#cfc;"
| 1990- || Win||align=left| Kaychonnoi Sor Sukanya || Lumpinee Stadium ||  Bangkok, Thailand  || Decision || 5 || 3:00
|-
| colspan=9 | Legend:

References

1973 births
Living people
Lamnamoon Sor.Sumalee
Muay Thai trainers
Lamnamoon Sor.Sumalee
Lightweight kickboxers
Featherweight kickboxers